Herodion of Patras (also Herodian or Rodion) was a relative of Saint Paul whom Paul greets in Romans 16:11. According to tradition, he was numbered among the Seventy Disciples and became bishop of Patras, where he suffered greatly. After beating, stoning, and stabbing him, they left him for dead, but St. Herodion arose and continued to serve the Apostles.

He was beheaded with Olympas in Rome while they were serving Saint Peter on the same day that St. Peter was crucified.  His feast days are celebrated on January 4 among the Seventy, April 8, and November 10.

Hymns

November 10
Troparion (Tone 3) 

Holy Apostles,  Erastus, Olympas, Herodian, Sosipater, Quartus and Tertius,
entreat the merciful God,
to grant our souls forgiveness of transgressions.

Kontakion (Tone 2)

Illumined by divine light, O holy apostles,
you wisely destroyed the works of idolatry.
When you caught all the pagans you brought them to the Master
and taught them to glorify the Trinity.

April 8
Troparion (Tone 1)  

Let us praise in hymns the six–fold choir of Apostles:
Herodion and Agabus,
Rufus, Asyncritus, Phlegon and holy Hermes.
They ever entreat the Trinity for our souls!

Kontakion (Tone 2)

You became the disciples of Christ
And all-holy Apostles,
O glorious Herodion, Agabus and Rufus,
Asyncritus, Phlegon and Hermes.
Ever entreat the Lord
To grant forgiveness of transgressions
To us who sing your praises.

Kontakion (Tone 4)

Like stars, O holy Apostles,
You illumine the way of the faithful with the light of the Holy Spirit.
You dispel the darkness of error as you gaze on God the Word!

Sources 
St. Nikolai Velimirovic, The Prologue from Ohrid

External links
Apostle Herodion of the Seventy, January 4 (OCA)
Apostle Herodion of the Seventy, and those with Him, April 8 (OCA)
Apostle Rodion of the Seventy, November 10 (OCA)
Agavos, Rouphos, Asynkritos, Phlegon, Herodion, & Hermes of the 70 Apostles (GOARCH)

References

Seventy disciples
1st-century deaths
1st-century Christian martyrs
1st-century bishops in Roman Achaea
Saints of Roman Achaia
Bishops of Patras
People in the Pauline epistles
Year of birth unknown